In Greek mythology, the Keres (Ancient Greek: Κῆρες), singular Ker (Κήρ), were female death-spirits. They were the goddesses who personified violent death and who were drawn to bloody deaths on battlefields.  Although they were present during death and dying, they did not have the power to kill. All they could do was wait and then feast on the dead. The Keres were daughters of Nyx, and as such the sisters of beings such as Moirai, who controlled the fate of souls, and Thanatos, the god of peaceful death.  Some later authorities, such as Cicero, called them by a Latin name, Tenebrae ("the Darknesses"), and named them daughters of Erebus and Nyx.

Etymology
The Greek word κήρ means "death" or "doom" and appears as a proper noun in the singular and plural as Κήρ and Κῆρες to refer to divinities. Homer uses Κῆρες in the phrase κήρες θανάτοιο, "Keres of death". By extension the word may mean "plague, disease"  and in prose "blemish or defect".  The relative verb  κεραΐζω or κείρω means "ravage or plunder". Sometimes in Homer the words κήρ and moira have similar meanings. The older meaning was probably "destruction of the dead", and Hesychius of Alexandria relates the word to the verb κηραινειν "decay".

Description

They were described as dark beings with gnashing teeth and claws and with a thirst for human blood. They would hover over the battlefield and search for dying and wounded men. A description of the Keres can be found in the Shield of Heracles (248–57):

Though not mentioned by Hesiod, Achlys may have been included among the Keres.

A parallel, and equally unusual personification of "the baleful Ker" is in Homer's depiction of the Shield of Achilles (Iliad, ix. 410ff), which is the model for the Shield of Heracles. These are works of art that are being described.

In the fifth century, Keres were portrayed as small winged sprites in vase-paintings adduced by J.E. Harrison (Harrison, 1903), who described apotropaic rites and rites of purification that were intended to keep the Keres at bay.

According to a statement of Stesichorus noted by Eustathius, Stesichorus "called the Keres by the name Telchines", whom Eustathius identified with the Kuretes of Crete, who could call up squalls of wind and would brew potions from herbs (noted in Harrison, p. 171).

The term Keres has also been cautiously used to describe a person's fate. An example of this can be found in the Iliad where Achilles was given the choice (or Keres) between either a long and obscure life and home, or death at Troy and everlasting glory. Also, when Achilles and Hector were about to engage in a fight to the death, the god Zeus weighed both warriors' keres to determine who shall die. As Hector’s ker was deemed heavier, he was the one destined to die and in the weighing of souls, Zeus chooses Hector to be killed.
During the festival known as Anthesteria, the Keres were driven away. Their Roman equivalents were Letum (“death”) or the Tenebrae (“shadows”).

Keres and Valkyries
Mathias Egeler suggests a connection exists between the Keres and the Valkyries of Norse mythology. Both deities are war spirits that fly over battlefields during conflicts and choose those to be slain. The difference is that Valkyries are benevolent deities in contrast to the malevolence of the Keres, perhaps due to the different outlook of the two cultures towards war. The word valkyrie derives from Old Norse valkyrja (plural valkyrjur), which is composed of two words; the noun valr (referring to the slain on the battlefield) and the verb kjósa (meaning "to choose"). Together, they mean "chooser of the slain". The Greek word "Ker" etymologically means destruction, death.

See also
 Badb

Notes

References 
 Gaius Julius Hyginus, Fabulae from The Myths of Hyginus translated and edited by Mary Grant. University of Kansas Publications in Humanistic Studies. Online version at the Topos Text Project.
Harrison, Jane Ellen, Prolegomena to the Study of Greek Religion 1903. Chapter V: "The demonology of ghosts and spites and bogeys"
Hesiod, Theogony from The Homeric Hymns and Homerica with an English Translation by Hugh G. Evelyn-White, Cambridge, MA., Harvard University Press; London, William Heinemann Ltd. 1914. Online version at the Perseus Digital Library. Greek text available from the same website.
March, J., Cassell's Dictionary Of Classical Mythology, London, 1999. 
Marcus Tullius Cicero, Nature of the Gods from the Treatises of M.T. Cicero translated by Charles Duke Yonge (1812-1891), Bohn edition of 1878. Online version at the Topos Text Project.
Marcus Tullius Cicero, De Natura Deorum. O. Plasberg. Leipzig. Teubner. 1917.  Latin text available at the Perseus Digital Library.
 Unknown. "Greek Gods and Goddesses".

External links
 

Greek death goddesses
Greek war deities
Personifications in Greek mythology
Women in Greek mythology
Children of Nyx